is a Japanese actress and fashion model.

Yamashita is represented with Stardust Promotion.

Biography
Yamashita decided to pursue a career as an actress when she watched Ko Shibasaki in the television drama Orange Days when she was in elementary school. She later auditioned for Stardust Promotion, which Shibasaki is affiliated with, in 2006.

In March 2007 she was chosen as the 12th Rehouse Girl of Mitsui Fudosan Realty. Later in April Yamashita became an exclusive model for the fashion magazine Hanachu. Her acting debut was in the drama Koisuru Nichiyōbi: Dai 3 Series in June.

In November 2008 Yamashita's first leading role in a terrestrial television drama was the Ai no Gekijō 40th anniversary programme Love Letter.

Her first leading role in a film was Someday's Dreamers later in December.

In July 2013, Yamashita played Arisa Morishige in the drama Limit whose character is bullied and runs away in extreme conditions.

Her first regular variety appearances was as an assistant on the television series A-Studio in April 2014.

Filmography

TV series

Films

Stage

Advertisements

Bibliography

Photo albums

Magazines

Books

Notes

References

External links
 

Japanese film actresses
Japanese stage actresses
Japanese television actresses
Japanese television personalities
Japanese female models
Stardust Promotion artists
1992 births
Living people
People from Tokushima (city)
21st-century Japanese actresses